A cure is a substance or procedure that ends a medical condition, such as a medication, a surgical operation, a change in lifestyle or even a philosophical mindset that helps end a person's sufferings; or the state of being healed, or cured. The medical condition could be a disease, mental illness, genetic disorder, or simply a condition a person considers socially undesirable, such as baldness or lack of breast tissue.

An incurable disease may or may not be a terminal illness; conversely, a curable illness can still result in the patient's death.

The proportion of people with a disease that are cured by a given treatment, called the cure fraction or cure rate, is determined by comparing disease-free survival of treated people against a matched control group that never had the disease.

Another way of determining the cure fraction and/or "cure time" is by measuring when the hazard rate in a diseased group of individuals returns to the hazard rate measured in the general population.

Inherent in the idea of a cure is the permanent end to the specific instance of the disease. When a person has the common cold, and then recovers from it, the person is said to be cured, even though the person might someday catch another cold. Conversely, a person that has successfully managed a disease, such as diabetes mellitus, so that it produces no undesirable symptoms for the moment, but without actually permanently ending it, is not cured.

Related concepts, whose meaning can differ, include response, remission and recovery.

Statistical model 
In complex diseases, such as cancer, researchers rely on statistical comparisons of disease-free survival (DFS) of patients against matched, healthy control groups. This logically rigorous approach essentially equates indefinite remission with cure. The comparison is usually made through the Kaplan-Meier estimator approach.

The simplest cure rate model was published by Joseph Berkson and Robert P. Gage in 1952. In this model, the survival at any given time is equal to those that are cured plus those that are not cured, but who have not yet died or, in the case of diseases that feature asymptomatic remissions, have not yet re-developed signs and symptoms of the disease. When all of the non-cured people have died or re-developed the disease, only the permanently cured members of the population will remain, and the DFS curve will be perfectly flat. The earliest point in time that the curve goes flat is the point at which all remaining disease-free survivors are declared to be permanently cured. If the curve never goes flat, then the disease is formally considered incurable (with the existing treatments).

The Berkson and Gage equation is 

Cure rate curves can be determined through an analysis of the data. The analysis allows the statistician to determine the proportion of people that are permanently cured by a given treatment, and also how long after treatment it is necessary to wait before declaring an asymptomatic individual to be cured.

Several cure rate models exist, such as the expectation-maximization algorithm and Markov chain Monte Carlo model. It is possible to use cure rate models to compare the efficacy of different treatments. Generally, the survival curves are adjusted for the effects of normal aging on mortality, especially when diseases of older people are being studied.

From the perspective of the patient, particularly one that has received a new treatment, the statistical model may be frustrating. It may take many years to accumulate sufficient information to determine the point at which the DFS curve flattens (and therefore no more relapses are expected). Some diseases may be discovered to be technically incurable, but also to require treatment so infrequently as to be not materially different from a cure. Other diseases may prove to have multiple plateaus, so that what was once hailed as a "cure" results unexpectedly in very late relapses. Consequently, patients, parents and psychologists developed the notion of psychological cure, or the moment at which the patient decides that the treatment was sufficiently likely to be a cure as to be called a cure. For example, a patient may declare himself to be "cured", and to determine to live his life as if the cure were definitely confirmed, immediately after treatment.

Related terms 
 Response Response is a partial reduction in symptoms after treatment.
 RecoveryRecovery is a restoration of health or functioning. A person who has been cured may not be fully recovered, and a person who has recovered may not be cured, as in the case of a person in a temporary remission or who is an asymptomatic carrier for an infectious disease.
 PreventionPrevention is a way to avoid an injury, sickness, disability, or disease in the first place, and generally it will not help someone who is already ill (though there are exceptions). For instance, many babies and young children are vaccinated against polio (a highly infectious disease) and other infectious diseases, which prevents them from contracting polio. But the vaccination does not work on patients who already have polio. A treatment or cure is applied after a medical problem has already started.
 TherapyTherapy treats a problem, and may or may not lead to its cure. In incurable conditions, a treatment ameliorates the medical condition, often only for as long as the treatment is continued or for a short while after treatment is ended. For example, there is no cure for AIDS, but treatments are available to slow down the harm done by HIV and extend the treated person's life. Treatments don't always work. For example, chemotherapy is a treatment for cancer, but it may not work for every patient. In easily cured forms of cancer, such as childhood leukaemia's, testicular cancer and Hodgkin lymphoma, cure rates may approach 90%. In other forms, treatment may be essentially impossible. A treatment need not be successful in 100% of patients to be considered curative. A given treatment may permanently cure only a small number of patients; so long as those patients are cured, the treatment is considered curative.

Examples 
Cures can take the form of natural antibiotics (for bacterial infections), synthetic antibiotics such as the sulphonamides, or fluoroquinolones, antivirals (for a very few viral infections), antifungals, antitoxins, vitamins, gene therapy, surgery, chemotherapy, radiotherapy, and so on. Despite a number of cures being developed, the list of incurable diseases remains long.

1700s 
Scurvy became curable (as well as preventable) with doses of vitamin C (for example, in limes) when James Lind published A Treatise on the Scurvy (1753).

1890s 
Antitoxins to diphtheria and tetanus toxins were produced by Emil Adolf von Behring and his colleagues from 1890 onwards. The use of diphtheria antitoxin for the treatment of diphtheria was regarded by The Lancet as the "most important advance of the [19th] Century in the medical treatment of acute infectious disease".

1930s 
Sulphonamides become the first widely available cure for bacterial infections.

Antimalarials were first synthesized, making malaria curable.

1940s 
Bacterial infections became curable with the development of antibiotics.

2010s 
Hepatitis C, a viral infection, became curable through treatment with antiviral medications.

See also 

 Eradication of infectious diseases
 Preventive medicine
 Remission (medicine)
 Relapse, the reappearance of a disease
 Spontaneous remission

References 

Clinical medicine
Drugs
Medical terminology
Therapy